Folkerts is a surname. Notable people with the surname include:

Brian Folkerts (born 1990), American football center 
Clayton Folkerts (1897–1964), American aircraft designer, whose designs include:
Folkerts SK-1
Folkerts SK-2
Folkerts SK-3
Folkerts Henderson Highwing
David Folkerts-Landau (born 1949), German economist
Knut Folkerts (born 1952), German terrorist and member of the Red Army Faction
Ulrike Folkerts (born 1961), German actress